Beyond Beyond (Swedish: Resan till Fjäderkungens Rike), is a 2014 English-language Swedish-Danish computer-animated comedy-drama film directed by the Danish animator Esben Toft Jacobsen. The movie had its world premiere on 10 February 2014 at the Berlin International Film Festival.

Plot
Jonah is a young bunny whose life is torn apart when his beloved mother dies and is taken away by the Feather King to the afterlife after she develops a bad cough. Unwilling to accept that his mother is gone, Jonah plots to travel to the other side and bring her back. He finally gains his chance when an old dog gives Jonah his ticket to the afterlife.

Cast

Reception 
Variety wrote that the creative team behind Beyond Beyond "invent an elaborate mythology around an impressive figure called the Feather King, who guards the realm where Johan, the rabbit boy, must venture, though the trip proves too dark and complicated for family crowds, limiting export prospects." Common Sense Media also commented upon the film's themes and expressed concern that they might be too dark for younger audiences. Dove marked Beyond Beyond with their "Family Approved" seal and wrote that it was "a charming little story about the loss of a loved one and how that loss effects others."

The SVT Nyheter Norrbotten praised the movie's 3D environment and compared it to works by Hayao Miyazaki, but also felt that the film's premise was too confusing.

References

External links
 
 
  as archived June 20, 2015

2014 films
2014 animated films
2014 computer-animated films
Danish animated films
Swedish animated films
2010s Swedish-language films
Films about the afterlife
2014 comedy-drama films
Danish comedy-drama films
Swedish comedy-drama films
Animated films about rabbits and hares
2010s Swedish films